A county hall or shire hall is a common name given to a building that houses the seat of local government for a county.

The location of the county hall has usually denoted the county town.

In the case of Surrey, England, when county boundaries changed the county hall remained in Kingston upon Thames. County halls usually contain a council chamber, committee rooms and offices.

List of county and shire halls

United Kingdom

England
County halls in England, with the ceremonial county they served, include:

Scotland
County halls ceased to have a role in Scotland in 1975, when a system of large regional councils was introduced. Former county halls in Scotland, with the county they served, include:

Northern Ireland
County halls ceased to have a role in Northern Ireland in 1973, when a system of local government districts was introduced. Former county halls in Northern Ireland, with the county they served, include:

Wales
County halls in Wales, with the county they served, include:
Historic counties

Preserved counties

Republic of Ireland
County halls in the Republic of Ireland, with the county they serve, include:

See also
Seat of local government
Old County Hall, Truro
Old Shirehall, Shrewsbury
Old Shire Hall, Durham

Notes

References

Seats of local government